Orchestra of Wolves is the debut album by English hardcore punk band Gallows. It was produced by Banks of fellow Hertfordshire band Haunts and released by In at the Deep End Records on 25 September 2006. A limited edition was re-issued in the United Kingdom in June 2007 with a bonus disc featuring live session tracks, two new songs and two covers. It was also re-issued in North America by Epitaph Records on July 10, 2007, with four bonus tracks ("Sick of Feeling Sick", "Black Heart Queen", "Nervous Breakdown", and "Staring at the Rude Bois").

Before the recording of this album began, guitarist Paul Laventure left the band. As a result, the album was recorded as a four-piece with Laurent Barnard, the band's main songwriter, recording all of the guitar parts himself.

Track listing
"Kill the Rhythm" 2:40
"Come Friendly Bombs" 3:32
"Abandon Ship" 3:12
"In the Belly of a Shark" 2:42
"Six Years" 4:06
"Rolling with the Punches" 3:36
"Last Fight for the Living Dead" 1:00
"Just Because You Sleep Next to Me Doesn't Mean You're Safe" 3:04
"Will Someone Shoot That Fucking Snake" 2:28
"Stay Cold" 3:07
"I Promise This Won't Hurt" 1:48
"Orchestra of Wolves" 4:43

UK re-issue bonus disc
"Abandon Ship" (BBC Punk session - 5 April 2007)
"Rolling with the Punches" (BBC Punk session - 5 April 2007)
"Will Someone Shoot That Fucking Snake" (BBC Punk session - 5 April 2007)
"Six Years" (BBC Punk session - 5 April 2007)
"Just Because You Sleep Next to Me" (BBC Rock session - 28 December 2006)
"In the Belly of a Shark" (BBC Rock session - 28 December 2006)
"Sick of Feeling Sick" (Previously unreleased)
"Black Heart Queen" (Previously unreleased)
"Nervous Breakdown" (Black Flag cover) / "Staring At The Rude Bois" (The Ruts cover featuring Lethal Bizzle) (Hidden Track, 12:06 into the track)

Personnel
 Frank Carter – lead vocals
 Laurent "Lags" Barnard – guitar, backing vocals, keyboards
 Stuart Gili-Ross – bass, backing vocals
 Lee Barratt – drums, percussion

References 

2006 debut albums
Gallows (band) albums